Wolsky is a surname. Notable people with the surname include:

Albert Wolsky (born 1930), American costume designer
Milton Wolsky (1916–1981), American painter and illustrator

See also
Wolski